The Communauté d'agglomération du Pays de Saint-Omer (CAPSO) is located in the Pas-de-Calais département, in northern France. It was formed on 1 January 2017 by the merger of the former Communauté d'agglomération de Saint-Omer, the Communauté de communes du Canton de Fauquembergues, the Communauté de communes du pays d'Aire and the Communauté de communes de la Morinie. Its seat is Longuenesse. Its area is 543.6 km2. Its population was 105,169 in 2018.

Composition
The communauté d'agglomération consists of the following 53 communes:

Aire-sur-la-Lys
Arques
Audincthun
Avroult
Bayenghem-lès-Éperlecques
Beaumetz-lès-Aire
Bellinghem
Blendecques
Bomy
Campagne-lès-Wardrecques
Clairmarais
Coyecques
Delettes
Dennebrœucq
Ecques
Enquin-lez-Guinegatte
Éperlecques
Erny-Saint-Julien
Fauquembergues
Febvin-Palfart
Fléchin
Hallines
Helfaut
Heuringhem
Houlle
Laires
Longuenesse
Mametz
Mentque-Nortbécourt
Merck-Saint-Liévin
Moringhem
Moulle
Nordausques
Nort-Leulinghem
Quiestède
Racquinghem
Reclinghem
Renty
Roquetoire
Saint-Augustin
Saint-Martin-d'Hardinghem
Saint-Martin-lez-Tatinghem
Saint-Omer
Salperwick
Serques
Thérouanne
Thiembronne
Tilques
Tournehem-sur-la-Hem
Wardrecques
Wittes
Wizernes
Zouafques

References

External links 
 Official CAPSO website

Saint-Omer
Saint-Omer